The Administration for Community Living (ACL) is part of the United States Department of Health and Human Services. It is headed by the Administrator and Assistant Secretary for Aging, who reports directly to the Secretary of Health and Human Services (HHS). ACL's Principal Deputy Administrator serves as Senior Advisor to the HHS Secretary for Disability Policy.

Organization
ACL is structured to provide general policy coordination while retaining programmatic operations specific to the needs of each population served. ACL is divided into the following units:

 Office of the Administrator
 Administration on Aging (AoA)
 Administration on Disabilities (AoD)
 National Institute on Disability, Independent Living, and Rehabilitation Research (NIDILRR)
 Center for Integrated Programs (CIP)
 Center for Management and Budget (CMB)
 Center for Policy and Evaluation (CPE)

See also
 President's Committee for People with Intellectual Disabilities

References

External links
 

United States Department of Health and Human Services agencies
Government agencies established in 2014
Organizations based in Washington, D.C.
Health education organizations
Health education in the United States
2014 establishments in the United States